Pablo Daniel Sarmiento (born 10 June 1971) is an Argentine former professional boxer in the Light Welterweight division and the former IBO Light Welterweight Champion. He is the brother of boxing trainer Gabriel Sarmiento. He replaced his brother Gabriel as Sergio Martínez's trainer in March 2011.

Professional career 
In March 1997, Sarmiento won the WBO Latino Super Featherweight Championship by beating Andre Nicola, at the time Nicola had a record of 14–1.

IBO Light Welterweight Championship 
On 14 July 2001, he won his first world title by knocking out the IBO Light Welterweight Champion Billy Schwer in Wembley, London.

After six years, Pablo returned from retirement to box against undefeated Mexican American Jesse Vargas, losing on the 1 round by KO. The bout was the main event of FSN's Fight Night Club.

Professional record 

|- style="margin:0.5em auto; font-size:95%;"
| style="text-align:center;" colspan="8"|34 Wins (16 Knockouts), 14 Defeats, 2 Draws
|-  style="text-align:center; margin:0.5em auto; font-size:95%; background:#e3e3e3;"
|  style="border-style:none none solid solid; "|Res.
|  style="border-style:none none solid solid; "|Record
|  style="border-style:none none solid solid; "|Opponent
|  style="border-style:none none solid solid; "|Type
|  style="border-style:none none solid solid; "|Rd., Time
|  style="border-style:none none solid solid; "|Date
|  style="border-style:none none solid solid; "|Location
|  style="border-style:none none solid solid; "|Notes
|- align=center
|Loss || 34-14-2 ||align=left| Jessie Vargas
|
|
|
|align=left|
|align=left|
|- align=center
|Loss || 34-13-2 ||align=left| Colin Lynes
|
|
|
|align=left|
|align=left|
|- align=center
|Win || 34-12-2 ||align=left| Gary Ryder
||| 8  ||  
|align=left|
|align=left|
|- align=center
|Win || 33-12-2 ||align=left| Stephanus Carr
||| 2  ||  
|align=left|
|align=left|
|- align=center
|Win || 32-12–2 ||align=left| Michael Ayers
||| 12  ||  ||align=left|
|align=left|
|- align=center
|Win || 31-12-2 ||align=left| Billy Schwer
||| 11  ||  ||align=left|
|align=left|
|- align=center
|style="background:#abcdef;"|Draw|| 30-12-2 ||align=left| Miguel Angel Pena
||| 6  ||  ||align=left|
|align=left|
|- align=center
|Win || 30-12-1 ||align=left| Carlos Rocha Tomar
||| 2  ||  ||align=left|
|align=left|
|- align=center
|Win || 29-12-1 ||align=left| Ricardo Daniel Silva
||| 10  ||  ||align=left|
|align=left|
|- align=center
|Loss || 28-12-1 ||align=left| Eddie Hopson
||| 8  ||  ||align=left|
|align=left|
|- align=center
|Loss || 28-11-1 ||align=left| Michael Ayers
||| 6  ||  ||align=left|
|align=left|
|- align=center
|Loss || 28-10-1 ||align=left| Oktay Urkal
||| 12  ||  ||align=left|
|align=left|
|- align=center
|Win || 28-9-1 ||align=left| Eduardo Bartolome Morales
||| 12  ||  ||align=left|
|align=left|
|- align=center
|Win || 27-9-1 ||align=left| Victor Hugo Paz
||| 12  ||  ||align=left|
|align=left|
|- align=center
|Loss || 26-9-1 ||align=left| Bruno Wartelle
||| 12  ||  ||align=left|
|align=left|
|- align=center
|Loss || 26-8-1 ||align=left| Wilson Enrique Galli
||| 12  ||  ||align=left|
|align=left|
|- align=center
|Win || 26-7-1 ||align=left| Ruben Dario Oliva
||| 10  ||  ||align=left|
|align=left|
|- align=center
|Draw || 25-7-1 ||align=left| Alfio Antonio Ruiz
||| 8  ||  ||align=left|
|align=left|
|- align=center
|Win || 25-7 ||align=left| Dante Fabian Tablada
||| 3  ||  ||align=left|
|align=left|
|- align=center

See also 
List of IBO world champions
Notable boxing families

References

External links 

Sportspeople from Santa Fe, Argentina
Light-welterweight boxers
Welterweight boxers
1971 births
Living people
Argentine male boxers